Divya Kakran (born 1998) is a freestyle wrestler from India. Divya has won 60 medals, including 17 gold medals in the Delhi State Championship, and has won the Bharat Kesari title eight times. She has been vocal about being disappointed by the lack of support from the government of Delhi in her pursuit for a medal at the Asian Games in 2018, despite writing to the government about her poor financial background. Divya is presently employed with the Indian Railways as senior ticket examiner.

Personal life and family 
Divya Kakran hails from Uttar Pradesh and belongs to a middle-class family from Purbaliyan village. Her father Suraj sain, sold Langots for livelihood, which her mother sewed at home. Kakran studied Physical Education and Sports Sciences (BPES) at the Noida College of Physical Education in Dadri, India.

Wrestling career 

 2017 Commonwealth Wrestling Championships - Kakran won a gold medal in the Commonwealth Championship held in South Johannesburg, Africa in December 2017.
 2017 Asian Wrestling Championships - Kakran won a silver medal in the women's freestyle 69 kg event at the 2017 Asian Wrestling Championships in India.
 2018 Bharat Kesri Dangal 23 March 2018 - Kakran won the Bharat Kesari title, held in Bhiwani, Haryana, India. In the final match of the competition, Kakran defeated Ritu Malik. Before this final match, Kakran defeated the international champion Geeta Phogat, who was famous enough to be portrayed in the movie Dangal.
 2018 Asian Games Jakarta Palembang - Kakran won a bronze medal in the women's freestyle 68 kg event at the 2018 Asian Games in Jakarta and Palembang, beating Taipei's Chen Wenling on account of technical superiority.
 In the 2022 Birmingham Commonwealth Games, she won Bronze in Women's 68 kg freestyle wrestling after losing to Tokyo Olympic silver medallist and 11-time African champion Blessing Oborududu from Nigeria.

Competitions

References

External links 
 Divya Kakran on Facebook
 https://unitedworldwrestling.org/node/6795
 International Wrestling Database

Indian female sport wrestlers
Commonwealth Games medallists in wrestling
Commonwealth Games bronze medallists for India
Wrestlers at the 2018 Asian Games
Medalists at the 2018 Asian Games
Asian Games bronze medalists for India
Asian Games medalists in wrestling
1998 births
Living people
Sport wrestlers from Uttar Pradesh
Sportswomen from Uttar Pradesh
Wrestlers at the 2018 Commonwealth Games
Wrestlers at the 2022 Commonwealth Games
Recipients of the Arjuna Award
Asian Wrestling Championships medalists
21st-century Indian women
Medallists at the 2018 Commonwealth Games
Medallists at the 2022 Commonwealth Games